U Got 2 Know is the second and most successful studio album by Italian Eurodance act Cappella. It was initially released via the Mercury Records label on March 7, 1994, and later re-released via other labels with slightly different track listings. The album saw great success in many European countries, peaking at number one in the Swiss and Finnish charts. Eight singles were released from the album.

Critical reception
Mark Frith from Smash Hits complimented the album as a "rather impressive debut LP".

Track listing

Note: The UK album release contains a longer, alternative mix of "U & Me" (track 4), clocking in at 4:26, which omits the female verses and has less of the 'U & Me, U & Me, U & Me forever' chorus.

Chart performance

References

External links
Various album covers

1994 albums
Capella (band) albums
Mercury Records albums